Dawg Jazz/Dawg Grass is an album by American musician David Grisman, released in 1983.

Track listing 
 "Dawg Jazz"
 "Steppin' with Stephane"
 "Fumblebee"
 "In a Sentimental Mood" (Duke Ellington, Irving Mills, Manny Kurtz)
 "14 Miles to Barstow"
 "Swamp Dawg"
 "Dawggy Mountain Breakdown"
 "Wayfaring Stranger" (Traditional)
 "Happy Birthday Bill Monroe"
 "Dawg Grass"

Personnel
David Grisman – mandolin, vocals
Tony Rice – guitar, vocals
Stephane Grappelli – violin
Darol Anger – mandolin, vocals
Earl Scruggs – banjo
Rob Wasserman – bass
Mike Marshall – guitar, mandolin, vocals
Ross Tomkins – piano
Martin Taylor – guitar
Don Ashworth – woodwind
John Bambridge – woodwind
Tommy Newsom  – woodwind
John Audino – trumpet
Pete Chrisleib – saxophone
Gilbert Falco – trombone
Bernie Pack – trombone
Bruce Paulson – trombone

Credits
Producer - David Grisman
Executive Producer - Craig Miller
Engineering - John Haeny and Bob Shumaker
Mastering - Greg Fulginiti

Chart positions

References

1983 albums
David Grisman albums